Michael Schmidt is an American attorney and prosecutor. He has served as the Multnomah County District Attorney since August 2020.

Originally set to begin his term on January 1, 2021, Governor Kate Brown appointed him to the job early, in August of 2020, to replace Rod Underhill, who retired in July.

Career

Early career 
Schmidt graduated from Vassar College with a BA in Political Science in 2003. He then worked for two years in New Orleans for Teach For America, teaching social studies and coaching basketball.

He then attended Lewis & Clark College, graduating with his Juris Doctor in 2008. He then became a Deputy District Attorney in Multnomah County, Oregon for six years, first under Mike Schrunk, who was the lead DA for 32 years.

Schmidt left the DA's office and joined the Oregon House and Senate Judiciary Committees in 2013, then led the Oregon Criminal Justice Commission in 2015.

District Attorney 
In 2020, Schmidt announced his plan to run for District Attorney in the May primary election. On May 19th, Schmidt beat challenger Ethan Knight, an assistant U.S. Attorney, in the nonpartisan race with 77% of the vote. Knight was endorsed by the incumbent Rod Underhill and the office's union, the Multnomah County Prosecuting Attorneys Association.

Schmidt represents a progressive view towards prosecutions and criminal justice reform, preferring alternatives to prison, against trial as an adult for juveniles, for police accountability, against mandatory sentencing, and against the death penalty. Since a DA has the power to decide who to prosecute, his stance can influence local and statewide cases to counter what has been described the "irrationality of our system" of biased prosecution using data-driven outcomes.

Days after the election results, on June 16, 2020, Rod Underhill resigned his position immediately, to the surprise of Schmidt. Underhill noted the changing environment with police violence, Black Lives Matter, and George Floyd protests. The Portland Mercury noted that Underhill's resignation was less than a week after the resignation of Portland Police Chief Jami Resch.

Governor Kate Brown appointed Schmidt to fill the seat on July 7, 2020. The following day, the president of Multnomah County Prosecuting Attorneys Association resigned in protest. Mike Schmidt took office on August 10, 2020.  

Announced formation of a "Justice Integrity Unit" on 1 September 2021, and dedicated $524,387 to staff the effort to examine wrongful convictions and review prison sentences for people serving time.  Ernest Warren, who founded the first Black-owned defense law firm in Oregon, will lead the unit.

In what the Oregonian called a "change of tone", he said, following protests in April 2022, “The violence and property destruction we’ve seen in Portland nearly 11 months is unacceptable,” said Schmidt.  “As district attorney, I will always defend a person’s right to free speech but I will not defend, nor support anyone who knowingly or recklessly or intentionally destroys property or engages in violence.” 

Long time prosecutor Amber Kinney resigned 10 January 2022, with a 7-page letter criticizing his leadership, saying that progress, especially for women, has been "set back decades".

In an opinion piece published 27 March 2022 in the Oregonian, Schmidt complained about a 300% increase in case count and 150 felony cases that cannot be prosecuted without violating the Constitution, for lack of a public defender.   A circuit court judge had recently dismissed three felony cases including serious domestic violence.  He admits to a prosecution rate of 7 of 10 burglaries referred by the police, who in turn refer only 10 of 100 burglaries reported, and he did not mention a conviction rate in the article.

George Floyd / Brionna Taylor protests  
Days into his Schmidt's job on August 10, 2020, Daryl Turner, president of the Portland Police Association wrote an open letter to Mayor/police commissioner Ted Wheeler and Schmidt, calling their "operational direction" insane, describing examples of violence, and telling Wheeler to "Step up and do your job". Directing comments at Schmidt, he called his running for office on a program of police accountability "a thinly veiled threat to indict police officers", again telling him to "Step up and do your job".

Schmidt gained notoriety shortly after taking office for refusing to prosecute people who were arrested participating in the George Floyd protests unless there is "deliberate property damage, theft, or threat of force." This meant dropping the majority of cases; by August 11, the office prosecuted 47 felonies out of 550 referred protest cases. 313 out of 417 misdemeanors were for interfering with a police officer, and 44 of 133 felonies were for riot. He stated he was "recognizing the right to speak". A notable case where he dropped charges was against Demetria Hester, a leader in the Wall of Moms movement who had been assaulted in a hate crime the day prior to the assailant's 2017 Portland train attack.

A police officer told Schmidt in a meeting that "I don’t trust anything you do or say because you’re antifa." In addition to the open letter from PPA's Turner telling Schmidt to "do your job", Turner also stated Schmidt he was "George Soros-backed", though the union denied he said that. After the reactions, an activist described the law enforcement responses as "lashing out", and another described it as political spin. Schmidt noted the irony between his office dropping minor infractions to events where white supremacists and alt-right groups like Patriot Prayer were given a free pass for rioting, including violence against people and pointing loaded weapons.

On September 4, 2020, Patriot Prayer leader Joey Gibson and a supporter sued Schmidt for an injunction over selective prosecution based on political beliefs. Both were given a felony riot charge for inciting a riot between Patriot Prayer and leftists gathering at Cider Riot in 2019. They are represented by James Buchal (Multnomah County GOP chair) and Derek Angus Lee; Oregon district court judge Karin Immergut has the case, as of September 17, 2020. On July 30, 2021 Chief Counsel to the Oregon Department of Justice Michael Slauson found the complaint against Mike Schmidt, among others in the District Attorney's Office, to be "unfounded".

Gun Violence
In a press conference with other Multnomah County leaders on September 23, 2021 Schmidt told victims of gun violence that "help is on the way" before announcing a $1 million investment from the county for added prosecutors and investigators devoted to homicides. This is the first investment for added prosecutors in the Multnomah County District Attorney's Office in decades. The announcement was coupled with a plan for collaboration between public health and public safety agencies, "The old war on crime approach to public safety, which leans almost exclusively on law enforcement, prosecution and punishment is both ineffective and causes profound long term harm especially on communities of color," County Chair Deborah Kafoury said at the press conference in reference to the County's 21st-century approach to addressing gun violence.

Personal life
Schmidt lives in Southeast Portland.

Published works 
 
 Multnomah County prosecutor resigned over what she described as the failed leadership of District Attorney Mike Schmidt https://www.documentcloud.org/documents/21180898-kinney-resignation-letter

See also 

 Normandale Park shooting

References 

Oregon Democrats
Vassar College alumni
Lewis & Clark Law School alumni
District attorneys in Oregon
Teach For America alumni
Lawyers from Portland, Oregon
Living people
Year of birth missing (living people)